The 1922 Central Michigan Normalites foindependents otball team represented Central Michigan Normal School, later renamed Central Michigan University, as an independent during the 1922 college football season. In their second season under head coach Wallace Parker, the Central Michigan football team compiled a 6–0–2 record, shut out six of eight opponents, and outscored all opponents by a combined total of 179 to 11. The team's victories included games with Ferris Institute (40–0), Grand Rapids Junior College (39–0), Northern State (62–0), Michigan Military Academy (7–0), Alma College (5–0), and Detroit Junior College (20–5). The team played the 1922 Michigan State Normal Normalites football team to a scoreless tie.

Schedule

References

Central Michigan
Central Michigan Chippewas football seasons
College football undefeated seasons
Central Michigan Normalites football